The National Schools Press Conference (NSPC) is the highest competition for journalism for both private and public elementary and secondary schools in the Philippines as per Republic Act 7079, also known as the Campus Journalism Act of 1991. The press conference includes both students from the elementary and secondary level and is usually held on the month of February. The event usually lasts for 4 to 7 days.

The journalism contest starts with the Division Schools Press Conference (DSPC), where the top three to fifteen in each category, depending on the size of the certain schools division, qualifies for the Regional Schools Press Conference (RSPC), from which the top three will be chosen to represent their respective regions in the National Schools Press Conference (NSPC).

History 
In November 1931, the Public Secondary Schools Press Association (PSSPA) had its first convention in what was then Pasig, Rizal. The PSSPA was founded by a high school principal, Ricardo Castro, and had 17 original member schools. During this first convention, writing competitions for the different sections of a school paper were held. The tradition continued year after year, as the number of member-schools increased, with different parts of Luzon as venues. After World War II, the PSSPA was reorganized and 49 member-schools participated in the National Convention held in Manila, Philippines.

By 1955, the PSSPA Convention had become the National Secondary Schools Press Conference. On January 10 and 11 of that year, 70 member-schools attended the conference in Bacolod. The individual competitions were open to all members, while the group competitions were held according to category. Group A for the group competitions was composed of those member-schools with populations of 1,500 and above, while Group B was composed of those member-schools with populations below 1,500. At that same conference, the National Secondary Schools Press Advisers Association was organized and it then passed a resolution calling for the authorization of staff members to handle school paper funds, subject to accounting. The resolution was subsequently approved by the Bureau of Public Schools.

In 1957, a third group classification was added. Group A members were schools with over 3,000 population; Group B members had populations ranging from 1,500 to below 3,000; while Group C members had below 1,500 population. During this year, the conference was held for a longer time, enabling the delegates to take part in longer educational tours of the host locality. A year later, the group classifications were again reorganized, placing schools with over 2,000 population in Group A, those with 1,000 to 2,000 population in Group B, and those with less than 1,000 in Group C. During this year, a Public School Circular was passed authorizing the solicitations of advertisements for school papers, under certain conditions.

In 1991, Republic Act No. 7079 was passed by Congress, aiming to promote campus journalism. The 50th National Secondary Schools Press Conference was held in early 1993 at Rizal High School in Pasig, the same locality that hosted the first PSSPA Convention. The next school year, 1993-1994, elementary schools were included in the convention, causing the word "secondary" to be dropped and the convention to be called the "National Schools Press Conference".

In December 1993, the National Schools Press Conference was to be held in Koronadal, South Cotabato for the first time. However, a week before the convention, when all preparations had been made and the host schools and municipalities were awaiting the arrival of the delegates, there was a bombing incident at Isulan, Sultan Kudarat. The Secretary of the Department of Education, Culture and Sports at that time, Armand Fabella, declared this sufficient grounds to move the convention to Baguio, prompting a storm of protest from then South Cotabato Governor Hilario de Pedro III, who had been one of the sponsors of the Campus Journalism Act when he was Representative of the 2nd District of South Cotabato, and then Representative Daisy Avance-Fuentes. This controversy caused the Southern Mindanao delegation to boycott the Baguio conference. Shortly afterwards, Ricardo Gloria replaced Fabella as Education Secretary, and in December 1994 the 52nd National Schools Press Conference was held at Koronadal National Comprehensive High School. In its 65th year, the annual NSPC was held in Koronadal in South Cotabato.

DepEd Director Joyce Andaya, said during the culmination of the 2019 NSPC, in Lingayen, Pangasinan that there is a scheme DepEd follows to come up with a host. In 4 years, they must have a record of 2 Luzon, 1 Visayas and 1 Mindanao hosts.

Venues 
The NSPC has been held in different locations across the country. The NSPC is scheduled annually in the middle of the month of March. Recently under DepEd Order 26 s. 2010, it was moved to the second week of April synchronizing all the culminating activities in all competitions as "Festival of Talents". Following is a list of past venues of the NSPC:
As per Joyce Andaya, DepEd Director, Cagayan Valley, particularly Tuguegarao will host the 99th anniversary of Campus Journalism in the Philippines.

Training and development 

Students who will compete in the National Schools Press Conference attend seminars before the actual competition. Preparation for the NSPC starts at the Division Level with the Division Schools Press Conference (DSPC). The editorial members of campus papers in a division compete in English or Filipino in different categories. The top ten or top five, depending on the region, who will win for each category in each language medium are then qualified for the Regional Schools Press Conference (RSPC). The next two winners are considered alternate qualifiers. Next, the top three winners of the RSPC will advance into the National Level, again with the next top two as alternates.

On October 6, 1999, however, Education Secretary Andrew Gonzales issued DECS Memorandum No. 437, Series of 1999, which stated that a contestant could participate in only two events and in only one medium provided that the two events did not conflict with each other. This was amended in 2002 with the issuance of DepEd Memorandum No. 4, Series of 2002, on January 11, 2002, by Education Secretary Raul Roco. DM No. 4 provided that a pupil or student could participate in a maximum of four events but in only one medium, and that there should be seven winners for every category from every region.

The News Reporting and Desktop Publishing categories were first introduced in 2003, with a demonstration having been held at the previous year's NSPC. The DepEd memorandum for this same year states that a student may opt to participate in as many categories as he is able within the same medium provided there are no conflicts in the schedule.

The 2012 National Schools Press Conference had a focus on digital literacy and its use in campus journalism, with a collaborative publishing contest launched, involving teams of seven students making a four-page tabloid using Microsoft Publisher and Adobe InDesign.

Starting on the 2016 National Schools Press Conference, a new group contest was added, the Television Broadcasting and Script Writing, wherein like its radio counterpart the participating students stimulated a live TV newscast from anchoring to production. It started as an exhibitional contest this year and will start as a formal group contest in 2017.

See also
Department of Education (Philippines)
Palanca Awards

References

Education in the Philippines
Competitions
Writing contests
Journalism awards